Robin Mark Eaglestone (born 1976) is a British musician.

Biography
He was the bassist for the metal band Cradle of Filth. Also known as Robin Graves, he joined Cradle of Filth in 1992 as 2nd guitarist for the recording of the Invoking the Unclean demo then later changed to bass for the Total Fucking Darkness demo. He was with the band until 2002.

Eaglestone is currently, working on his own project, Imperial Black. He has also previously played with Criminal, Belphegor, Abgott, Grimfist, and December Moon.

During Cradle of Filth's tenure, each member's position in the band is described in a different manner (e.g. Vocals into "Dark Immortal Screams" or "Lycanthroat"). Though everyone else's role was described differently on each successive album, Robin's was always called "Nocturnal Pulse".

Discography
Cradle of Filth, Total Fucking Darkness demo, 1992
Cradle of Filth, The Principle of Evil Made Flesh, 1994
Cradle of Filth, Vempire or Dark Faerytales in Phallustein EP, 1996
Cradle of Filth, Dusk and Her Embrace, 1996
Cradle of Filth, Cruelty and the Beast, 1998
Cradle of Filth, PanDaemonAeon DVD, 1999
Cradle of Filth, From the Cradle to Enslave EP, 1999
Cradle of Filth, Midian, 2000
Cradle of Filth, Bitter Suites to Succubi, 2001
Cradle of Filth, Live Bait for the Dead, 2002
December Moon, Source Of Origin, 1996

References

External links
 Official Myspace for Robin Eaglestone and Imperial Black

1976 births
Living people
Cradle of Filth members
Black metal musicians
English heavy metal bass guitarists
Male bass guitarists
21st-century English bass guitarists